Leticia Zikpi (born 12 October 1986) is a Ghanaian footballer who plays as a forward for the Ghana women's national football team. She captained the team at the 2014 African Women's Championship. At the club level, she played for Immigration Accra in Ghana.

References

1986 births
Living people
Ghanaian women's footballers
Ghana women's international footballers
Place of birth missing (living people)
Women's association football forwards